Karen Canfell is an Australian epidemiologist and cancer researcher.

After being awarded a D.Phil. from Oxford in 2004 with a thesis entitled Use of hormone replacement therapy as a potential co-factor in the neoplastic progression of HPV-related cervical disease, Canfell returned to Australia to work for the Cancer Council in Sydney where she continued to work on cervical cancer in particular and all its ramifications, as well as the epidemiology of breast, and other cancers.

With the advent of HPV vaccines and the mass HPV vaccination programs in Australia for girls (starting in 2007) and boys (starting in 2013) to prevent HPV infection, her interests turned to monitoring the effects of such programs, appropriate screening for cervical cancer in Australia and other countries. A major focus has been how to do this effectively in developing and low-income countries as well as in high-income countries.

Together with her team, her work was fundamental in Australia making the 2017 transition of their national cervical screening program from cytology (pap smears) to a 5-yearly HPV DNA-based screening, and her work both with respect to other countries and in Australia means that Australia is on track to eliminate cervical cancer by 2028.

Career 
Canfell worked for the NSW  Cancer Council from approximately 2004 to 2011.  By 2012 Canfell was affiliated with both the  Cancer Research Division of the Cancer Council and the School of Public Health at the University of Sydney. By 2013 she was a professor at UNSW (Prince of Wales Clinical School) and continued there until at least 2019.

From approximately 2020 she has been the director of The Daffodil Centre at  the University of Sydney (a joint venture with the Cancer Council). She is a co-leader of the World Health Organisation (WHO) Cervical Cancer Elimination Modelling Consortium.

Awards 
In 2019 she became a Fellow of the Australian Academy of Health and Medical Science, and in 2020 won an Elizabeth Blackburn Investigator grant award for leadership in Health Services Research. In 2015 she won the NHMRC National Award for Research Excellence and was also nominated that year as a Woman of Influence by Westpac  and the Australian Financial Review.

In 2021 she was invited to give the prestigious Richard Doll Seminar at Oxford where she spoke as co-leader of the World Health Organisation (WHO) Cervical Cancer Elimination Modelling Consortium on the topic of the WHO's strategy for the elimination of cervical cancer (The road to cervical cancer elimination).

References

External links

WorldCat: Karen Canfell publications

Cancer epidemiologists
Australian women epidemiologists
Australian women scientists
Alumni of the University of Oxford
Living people
Fellows of the Australian Academy of Health and Medical Sciences
Year of birth missing (living people)